Joanna McKittrick (1954 – November 15, 2019) was an American engineer and college professor, the second woman to join the engineering faculty at the University of California, San Diego (UCSD).

Early life 
Joanna McKittrick was born in New Jersey, the daughter of John R. McKittrick and Estella Ruth Pederson McKittrick. Her father was a doctor and her mother was a teacher. She earned a bachelor's degree in mechanical engineering from the University of Colorado, Boulder, and a master's degree from Northwestern University. She completed doctoral studies at the Massachusetts Institute of Technology, in the field of materials science and engineering.

Career 
McKittrick was a professor in the engineering program at the University of California, San Diego, from 1988. She was the second woman to join the program (chemical engineer Jan B. Talbot was the first). McKittrick's research focused luminescent materials for medical, automotive, and aviation applications, and biomaterials such as chitin, keratin, and collagen. She worked with fellow UCSD professor Marc A. Meyers on biomaterials. "Mother Nature gives us templates," she explained in 2013, of her work studying spiders, seahorses, boxfish, and porcupines. "We are trying to understand them better so we can implement them in new materials."

McKittrick was a fellow of the American Ceramic Society. She wrote or co-wrote over a hundred academic journal articles, and was an editor of the Journal of the American Ceramic Society. McKittrick was a mentor for minority and women engineering students, including Lauren Rohwer and Olivia Graeve. She was faculty advisor of UCSD's student chapter of the National Society of Black Engineers.

Personal life 
McKittrick died in November 2019, aged 65 years, at her home in La Jolla, California. Her colleagues held a memorial at the 8th International Conference on Mechanics of Biomaterials and Tissues a month later.

References

External links 

 Website of the McKittrick Group, showing her UCSD laboratory's ongoing work on luminescent materials and biological materials.
 An interview with McKittrick at the blog Reigning It (January 19, 2016).

1954 births
2019 deaths
American women engineers
American materials scientists
University of Colorado Boulder alumni
Northwestern University alumni
MIT School of Engineering alumni
University of California, San Diego faculty
20th-century women engineers
Women materials scientists and engineers
20th-century American engineers
21st-century American engineers
21st-century women engineers
Fellows of the American Ceramic Society
20th-century American women
21st-century American women